Tall Ship Chronicles is a television series produced in Canada in 2001 and 2002. It followed the training of Canadian journalist and actor Andrew Younghusband on an 18-month sail training voyage around the World, on the barque Picton Castle.

Originally, a new episode was aired approximately once per month. Some of the people in the show are the ship's professional crew, while many are trainees who joined the ship to travel or learn about tall ship sailing. The number of crew when the ship began its voyage from Nova Scotia, Canada, was approximately four dozen. Some of the trainees had only booked one leg of the voyage while others had signed on for the entire 18 months. Some left early because they fell in love while on board — or because of personality conflicts — while others decided to stay on board longer than they'd initially planned. The show follows the interpersonal relations between many of the people on board while also showing a bit about the various islands the ship visits during the voyage. 

This was the Picton Castle's second sail-training voyage around the World. The vessel contained a supply of text books in her hold, which she distributed to a number of isolated communities in the South Pacific, including The Cook Islands, Pitcairn Island, Tonga, French Polynesia, Samoa, and Fiji. The show first aired in Canada and has subsequently been aired in various European markets.

External links 
 
 The sailing training vessel Picton Castle

Tall ships
2000s Canadian reality television series
2001 Canadian television series debuts
2002 Canadian television series endings